Shake, Rattle and Polka! is an album by Jimmy Sturr and His Orchestra, released through Rounder Records on October 11, 2005. In 2006, the album won Sturr the Grammy Award for Best Polka Album.

Track listing
 "Kansas City" (Jerry Leiber and Mike Stoller) – 2:32
 "Sea Cruise" (Huey "Piano" Smith) – 3:10
 "Detour" (Paul Westmoreland) – 1:50
 "Unchained Melody" (Alex North, Hy Zaret) – 2:53
 "Tossin' and Turnin'" (Ritchie Adams, Malou Rene) – 2:51
 "Maybellene" (Chuck Berry) – 2:24
 "I Walk the Line" (Johnny Cash) – 2:41
 "You Belong to Me" (Pee Wee King) – 3:04
 "Blueberry Hill" (Vincent Rose, Larry Stock) – 2:27
 "Love Me Tender" (Vera Matson, Elvis Presley) – 3:33
 "Rock Around the Clock" (DeKnight, Friedman) – 1:43
 "Promised Land" (Berry) – 2:40

Personnel

 Ritchie Adams – Composer
 Ray Barno Orchestra – Clarinet, Sax (Baritone)
 Chuck Berry – Composer
 Mark Capps – Engineer
 Johnny Cash – Composer
 Dennis Coyman – Drums
 Ray DeBrown – Arranger
 Jimmy DeKnight – Composer
 Nick Devito – Clarinet, Sax (Alto)
 Joe Donofrio – Producer, Mixing, Audio Production
 The Duprees – Vocals
 Chris Eddy – Vocals, Guest Appearance
 Duane Eddy – Vocals, Performer, Guest Appearance
 Frankie Ford – Vocals, Guest Appearance
 Max Friedman – Composer
 Gennarose – Vocals
 David Greenberger – Liner Notes
 Allen Henson – Vocals (background)
 Ken Irwin – Producer, Mixing, Audio Production
 Johnny Karas – Sax (Tenor), Vocals
 Pee Wee King – Composer
 Dave Kowalski – Assistant Engineer
 Jerry Leiber – Composer
 Joe Magnuszewski – Clarinet, Sax (Alto)
 Vera Matson – Composer

 Delbert McClinton – Vocals, Guest Appearance
 Dr. Toby Mountain – Mastering
 Willie Nelson – Vocals, Guest Appearance
 Alex North – Composer
 Louis Dean Nunley – Vocals (background)
 The Orchestra – Performer
 Eric Parks – Trumpet
 Rich Pavasaris – Bass
 Al Piatkowski – Accordion
 Tom Pick – Producer, Engineer, Mixing, Audio Production
 Elvis Presley – Composer
 Malou Rene – Composer
 Vincent Rose – Composer
 Brad SanMartin – Song Notes
 Keith Slattery – Piano
 Huey "Piano" Smith – Composer
 Larry Stock – Composer
 Mike Stoller – Composer
 Jimmy Sturr – Mixing
 Frank Urbanovitch – Fiddle, Vocals
 Paul Westmoreland – Composer
 Henry Will – Arranger
 Curtis Young – Vocals (background)
 Hy Zaret – Composer

See also
 Polka in the United States

References

2005 albums
Grammy Award for Best Polka Album
Jimmy Sturr albums
Rounder Records albums